The following radio stations broadcast on FM frequency 95.3 MHz:

Argentina
 95.3 Ayacucho in Ayacucho, Buenos Aires
 Acción 
 Atlántida in Buenos Aires
 Cadena Vida in San Juan
 Capital in Corrientes
 Cielo in Posadas, Misiones
 Contacto in José C. Paz, Buenos Aires
 Horizonte in Entre Ríos
 Ilusiones in Tres Arroyos, Buenos Aires
 Impacto in Villa Gobernador Gálvez, Santa Fe
 La 95 in Ayacucho, Buenos Aires
 Laguna del Plata in La Para, Córdoba
 Metro Mendoza in Mendoza
 Neo in Oberá, Misiones
 Original in Helvecia, Santa Fe
 Radio Con Vos Mar del Plata in Mar del Plata, Buenos Aires
 Radio María in 25 de Mayo, Buenos Aires
 Radio María in San Nicolás de los Arroyos, Buenos Aires
 Radio María in Reducción, Córdoba
 Radio María in Santa Rosa de Calamuchita, Córdoba
 Radio María in Concordia, Entre Ríos
 Tropical Latina in Villa de Merlo, San Luis 
 SOFIA in La Plata, Buenos Aires
 Sol in Diamante, Entre Ríos
 Volver in Chascomus, Buenos Aires
 X4 in Laprida, Buenos Aires

Australia
 Radio National in Cooma, New South Wales
 2PTV in Sydney, New South Wales
 3SRR in Shepparton, Victoria
 3YFM in Warrnambool, Victoria
 6AAY in Albany, Western Australia
 6EBA-FM in Perth, Western Australia

Canada (Channel 237)
 CBAL-FM-2 in Lameque, New Brunswick
 CBNQ-FM in Trepassey, Newfoundland and Labrador
 CBTH-FM in Terrace, British Columbia
 CBUB-FM in Osoyoos, British Columbia
 CBVM-FM in Iles-de-la-Madeleine, Quebec
 CBVX-FM in Quebec City, Quebec
 CBZW-FM in Woodstock, New Brunswick
 CFGW-FM-1 in Swan River, Manitoba
 CFWH-FM-1 in Whitehorse, Yukon
 CFYK-FM in Yellowknife, Northwest Territories
 CHOE-FM in Matane, Quebec
 CHUT-FM in Lac-Simon, Quebec
 CHXL-FM in Okanese Indian Reserve, Saskatchewan
 CIFM-FM-6 in Cache Creek, British Columbia
 CING-FM in Hamilton, Ontario
 CINI-FM in Mistassini, Quebec
 CISE-FM-1 in Caron, Saskatchewan
 CJRG-FM-4 in L'Anse-a-Valleau, Quebec
 CJXK-FM in Cold Lake, Alberta
 CKZX-FM-1 in Kaslo, British Columbia
 CKZZ-FM in Vancouver, British Columbia
 VF7284 in Ste Rose du Lac, Manitoba

China 
 CNR The Voice of China in Baoji

Democratic Republic of the Congo
 Radio de la Femme in Kinshasa from 2020

Greece
 viva fm 95.3 1 from Ptolemaida

Malaysia
 Nasional FM in Selangor and Western Pahang

Mexico
 XHAOP-FM in Acatlán de Osorio, Puebla
 XHCOB-FM in Ciudad Obregón, Sonora
 XHDCH-FM in Santa Ana (Ciudad Delicias), Chihuahua
 XHEJU-FM in Ejutla de Crespo, Oaxaca
 XHEVP-FM in Acapulco, Guerrero
 XHGN-FM in Piedras Negras, Veracruz
 XHHIT-FM in Tecate, Baja California
 XHIN-FM in Culiacán, Sinaloa
 XHJR-FM in Petatlán, Guerrero
 XHKM-FM in Minatitlán, Veracruz
 XHLPZ-FM in Lampazos, Nuevo León
 XHLRS-FM in Villagrán, Tamaulipas
 XHMAC-FM in Manzanillo, Colima
 XHMH-FM in Mérida, Yucatán
 XHNB-FM in San Luis Potosí, San Luis Potosí
 XHOX-FM in Tampico, Tamaulipas
 XHPEDJ-FM in Encarnación de Díaz, Jalisco
 XHPFRT-FM in El Fuerte, Sinaloa
 XHPSAL-FM in Salina Cruz, Oaxaca
 XHPXIC-FM in Xicotepec de Juárez, Puebla
 XHPY-FM in Tepic, Nayarit
 XHRCB-FM in Iguala, Guerrero
 XHROO-FM in Chetumal, Quintana Roo
 XHRT-FM in Reynosa, Tamaulipas
 XHSH-FM in Mexico City
 XHSJB-FM in San Juan Bautista Valle Nacional, Oaxaca
 XHUK-FM in Caborca, Sonora
 XHWM-FM in San Cristóbal de las Casas, Chiapas

Serbia
 Radio Belgrade 1 from the Avala Tower

United States (Channel 237)
 KAJI-LP in Palm Desert, California
  in Broken Bow, Nebraska
 KBHH in Kerman, California
  in Douglas, Arizona
 KCPZ-LP in Kansas City, Missouri
  in Red Oak, Iowa
  in East Camden, Arkansas
  in Dumas, Texas
 KDJS-FM in Willmar, Minnesota
  in Clinton, Missouri
  in Sun Valley, Idaho
 KEPH-LP in Friendswood, Texas
 KERC-LP in Kermit, Texas
  in Paris, Arkansas
 KEWZ-LP in West Monroe, Louisiana
 KGSL in Winona, Minnesota
 KHCA in Wamego, Kansas
 KHYI in Howe, Texas
  in Iowa Falls, Iowa
  in Humboldt, Kansas
 KJJB in Eagle Lake, Texas
 KKBC-FM in Baker, Oregon
 KKWZ in Rugby, North Dakota
 KLCR in Lakeview, Oregon
 KLEP-LP in Louisville, Colorado
  in Oildale, California
 KLRK in Los Gatos, California
  in Pierre, South Dakota
  in Lawton, Oklahoma
 KNEL-FM in Brady, Texas
 KNOF in Saint Paul, Minnesota
 KOJP in Presidio, Texas
 KORG-LP in Cleveland, Texas
  in Fort Bragg, California
 KPND in Deer Park, Washington
 KQKI-FM in Bayou Vista, Louisiana
 KQKL in Keokuk, Iowa
 KQMG-FM in Independence, Iowa
  in Elko, Nevada
  in Wellington, Utah
 KSIK-LP in Greeley, Colorado
 KTQA-LP in Tacoma, Washington
 KTTF-LP in Tomball, Texas
  in Vacaville, California
 KUJZ in Creswell, Oregon
 KURY-FM in Brookings, Oregon
  in Judsonia, Arkansas
  in Dilley, Texas
 KWKN in Wakeeney, Kansas
 KWLL in Gilmer, Texas
 KXDM-LP in Worland, Wyoming
  in Ellensburg, Washington
 KXMO-FM in Owensville, Missouri
 KXTZ in Pismo Beach, California
 KXXK in Hoquiam, Washington
 KYDN in Monte Vista, Colorado
 KYFC-LP in El Centro, California
  in Jackson, Wyoming
 KZLD-LP in Houston, Texas
  in Corinth, Mississippi
 WALV-FM in Ooltewah, Tennessee
  in Machias, Maine
 WBCK in Battle Creek, Michigan
 WBEV-FM in Beaver Dam, Wisconsin
 WBKT in Norwich, New York
  in Shamokin, Pennsylvania
 WBPE in Brookston, Indiana
  in Clare, Michigan
 WDNH-FM in Honesdale, Pennsylvania
 WEBL in Coldwater, Mississippi
 WEGG in Bowman, Georgia
 WFBR-LP in Mount Washington, Kentucky
 WFFN in Coaling, Alabama
 WFNX in Grand Marais, Minnesota
 WFRK in Quinby, South Carolina
  in Spooner, Wisconsin
  in Whitehall, Michigan
  in Southampton, New York
 WHGE-LP in Wilmington, Delaware
  in South Boston, Virginia
 WHMA-FM in Alexandria, Alabama
 WHRB at Cambridge, Massachusetts
  in Carrollton, Kentucky
  in Rantoul, Illinois
 WJEW-LP in Miami, Florida
  in Washington, Pennsylvania
 WJTB-FM in South Congaree, South Carolina
  in Laurel, Delaware
  in Colonial Heights, Virginia
 WKLM in Millersburg, Ohio
  in Kenton, Ohio
 WKVN in Morganfield, Kentucky
 WLFK in Gouverneur, New York
 WLHN-LP in Brandenburg, Kentucky
 WLJM-LP in Miami Beach, Florida
  in Norwalk, Ohio
 WLKW in Celoron, New York
 WMNH-LP in Manchester, New Hampshire
 WNDI-FM in Sullivan, Indiana
 WNLA-FM in Drew, Mississippi
 WNOZ-LP in New Orleans, Louisiana
  in Wanchese, North Carolina
  in Fort Myers, Florida
  in Greenfield, Massachusetts
  in Maitland, Florida
  in Adrian, Michigan
 WRHR-LP in Corbin, Kentucky
  in Ottawa, Illinois
  in Rainelle, West Virginia
 WRLD in Valley, Alabama
 WRSC-FM in Bellefonte, Pennsylvania
  in Winnebago, Illinois
  in Centralia, Illinois
 WTBG in Brownsville, Tennessee
  in York Center, Maine
 WTRC-FM in Niles, Michigan
  in Towanda, Pennsylvania
 WUME-FM in Paoli, Indiana
  in Nashville, Georgia
  in Wilmore, Kentucky
 WWMD-LP in Ashland, Wisconsin
 WWOK-LP in Greenville, South Carolina
 WWOO in Dillsboro, North Carolina
 WWSS in Tuscarora Township, Michigan
  in Winslow, Maine
  in Rural Retreat, Virginia
  in Homosassa Springs, Florida
 WXEI-LP in Crestview, Florida
 WXLF in White River Junction, Vermont
  in Clinton, Tennessee
  in Xenia, Ohio
  in Lumberton, Mississippi
 WZRV in Front Royal, Virginia

References

Lists of radio stations by frequency